American Charities for Palestine (ACP) is a charitable 501 (c) (3) nonprofit organization based in Washington, DC that supports the development of Palestine's education and health sectors.

History
ACP was established in June 2007. In August 2008, ACP signed a Memorandum of Understanding (MOU) with the United States Agency for International Development (USAID) ensuring that all recipients of ACP donations in Palestine are fully vetted and approved by USAID. This is the first such agreement between USAID and any private organization, and it was described by USAID Administrator Henrietta Fore as a “historic step.”

Previous projects

Since signing its partnership agreement with USAID, ACP spearheaded three charitable initiatives worth more than $600,000, which benefited Palestinians in the West Bank.

In 2008, ACP, the Palestinian Ministry of Education, and USAID distributed 1,000 laptop computers that were donated by One Laptop per Child. The laptops were delivered to schools managed by the Palestinian National Authority (PA), United Nations Relief and Works Agency for Palestine Refugees in the Near East (UNRWA), and the private sector.

In 2009, ACP presented the Spafford Children’s Center with a contribution of $5,000 for the well-being of the children of Jerusalem.

Also in 2009, ACP partnered with CHF International and the Sheikh Mohammed Shami Foundation to initiate a $300,000 development project in the West Bank village of Beit Ur Al-Tahta, installing streetlights along all village roads and making structural improvements to the main road and that leading to the new girls’ high school already donated by the Shami Foundation.

Board of directors

Ghassan Salameh -- Ghassan Salameh is Executive Vice President with Booz Allen Hamilton. He leads the firm’s Transportation business. He has over 30 years of experience from working with clients in the private and public sectors in countries all over the world.

Hani Findakly -- Hani Findakly is an investment banker who has served for 25 years in senior capacity on Wall Street firms, including, most recently as Chairman and Director of Dillion Read Management and as Vice Chairman and Director of Clinton Group Inc. He has extensive experience in finance, management and international development; ranging from working on Wall Street to over ten years as Chief Investment Officer of the World Bank.

Ziad J. Asali, M.D. -- Ziad Asali, M.D., is a co-founder of ACP and the President and founder of the American Task Force on Palestine, a 501(c) 3 non-profit, non-partisan organization based in Washington, DC.

Asali is a long-time activist on Middle East issues. He has been a member of the Chairman's Council of American-Arab Anti-Discrimination Committee (ADC) since 1982, and has served as ADC's President from 2001-2003. He served as the President of the Arab-American University Graduates (AAUG) from 1993–1995, and was Chairman of the American Committee on Jerusalem (ACJ), which he co-founded, from 1995-2003. He is a Diplomat of the Board of Internal Medicine and a Fellow of the American College of Physicians. He served as a member of the United States official delegation to the funeral of Chairman Yasser Arafat and as a member of the United States official delegation to observe the Palestinian Presidential elections in January 2005. He also was a delegate with the National Democratic Institute (NDI) to monitor the Palestinian Legislative election in January 2006. He was named "Arab American of the Year" by the Arab American Community Center for Economic and Social Services (AACCESS) of Ohio in 2006.

In August 2007, Asali traveled with Undersecretary of State Karen Hughes to Palestine as a member of the official delegation of the U.S. Department of State to monitor the launch of the Middle East Investment Initiative Program. On December 3, 2007 Asali was appointed one of four co-chairs of the U.S. Public-Private Partnership. This Partnership was launched by Secretary of State Condoleezza Rice to promote economic and educational opportunities for the Palestinian People with the goal of improving the Palestinian economy, building institutions and helping to educate Palestinian youth in good governance and good citizenship.

Asali was born in Jerusalem, where he completed his elementary and secondary education. He received an M.D. from the American University of Beirut (AUB) Medical School in 1967. He completed his residency in Salt Lake City, Utah, and then practiced medicine in Jerusalem before returning to the US in 1973. Asali was the Medical Director and Chairman of the Board at the Christian County Medical Clinic in Taylorville, Illinois and he served as Chairman of the Board of Physicians Health Association of Illinois before he retired in 2000.

See also
 American Task Force on Palestine
 Ziad Asali

References

External links
 American Charities for Palestine website

Arab-American organizations
Non-governmental organizations involved in the Israeli–Palestinian peace process
Charities based in Washington, D.C.
State of Palestine–United States relations
Development charities based in the United States
Foreign charities operating in the State of Palestine